John David Burnett (25 February 1840 – 18 June 1878) was an English first-class cricketer who played for Surrey. Having played from 1882 to 1890, he appeared in five first-class matches. His brother was Ernest Burnett, who was also a first-class cricketer.

He was educated at Harrow School for whom he played cricket. Born in Vauxhall, London, Burnett died in Pietermaritzburg, South Africa.

References

1840 births
1878 deaths
English cricketers
Surrey cricketers
Surrey Club cricketers
Gentlemen of the South cricketers
People educated at Harrow School